This list of people executed by the U.S. state of Arizona since capital punishment was resumed in 1976 comprises 40 persons, all male, convicted of murder and executed at Florence State Prison in Florence, Arizona.

See also 
 Capital punishment in Arizona
 Capital punishment in the United States

Notes 


References

External links 
 Arizona Department of Corrections -- Death Row and Executions

 
People executed
Arizona
Arizona-related lists